26 Avenue SE is a planned and approved CTrain light rail station in Calgary, Alberta, Canada part of the Green Line. Construction will begin in 2022 and complete in 2027 as part of construction stage one, segment one. The station is located in Alyth/Bonnybrook/Manchester near Barlow Trail.  

The station is located to become the southern anchor for a future main street along 11 Street SE and will be elevated, similar to the existing Sunalta Station. The land surrounding the future station is city-owned and offers scenic views of the Rocky Mountains and the downtown Calgary skyline. The area will be redeveloped with transit oriented development, and approximately 7,600 new residents are anticipated to move to the area after construction of the station. Additionally, it will provide access to the Crossroads Market, as well as the southeastern portion of Ramsay and the industrial areas of Alyth, Bonnybrook and Manchester.

References 

CTrain stations
Railway stations scheduled to open in 2027